Night Club is a 2011 American comedy film starring Ernest Borgnine and Mickey Rooney.  It is the directorial debut of Sam Borowski.

Plot
Justin (Zachary Abel), Nikki (Ahney Her) and Chris (Bryan Williams) take jobs at a retirement home to pay their way through college. With the help of Alfred (Ernest Borgnine), one of the residents, they set up a nightclub on the premises.

Cast

Awards
The film won Best Feature, Best Director, Best Actor  (Borgnine), Best Actress (Lyonne), and Best Supporting Actor/Actress (Kellerman) at the Golden Door International Film Festival in Jersey City, New Jersey.

References

External links
 

2011 films
2010s English-language films
American comedy films
2011 comedy films
2011 directorial debut films
2010s American films